Wilhelm Oechsli (6 October 1851, Riesbach – 26 April 1919) was a Swiss historian.

Oechsli studied theology and history at Berlin and Zürich, under Theodor Mommsen among others. In 1887 he took up the new chair of Swiss history at the Swiss Federal Institute of Technology Zurich. From 1893 to 1919 he was professor of history at the University of Zürich. He tried to popularize critical historiography, challenging the legendary traditions about the Swiss national past:

Works
 Die Anfänge der Schweizerischen Eidgenossenschaft zur sechsten Säkularfeier des ersten ewigen Bundes vom 1. August 1291, Zürich: Ulrich, 1891.
 Geschichte der Schweiz im Neunzehnten Jahrhundert, 2 vols, Leipzig: S. Hirzel, 1903
 History of Switzerland, 1499–1914, Cambridge: Cambridge University Press, 1922. Translated from the German by Eden and Cedar Paul.

References

External links
 
Wilhelm Oechsli (1851–1919)

1851 births
1919 deaths
19th-century Swiss historians
Swiss male writers
Academic staff of ETH Zurich
20th-century Swiss historians